Green Island, also known by other names, is a small volcanic island in the Pacific Ocean about  off the eastern coast of Taiwan. The island once served as a penal colony for political prisoners during Taiwan's period of martial law, although today it is primarily known as a tourist hotspot.

Names

The name "Green Island" is a calque of the island's Chinese name, written  in traditional characters. The name was adopted by the Republic of China on August 1, 1949, at the behest of Huang Shih-hung , the magistrate of Taitung.

History
The island was originally inhabited by the aboriginal Amis people.

In March 1864 the British brig Susan Douglas was swept off course and wrecked on the island. Her captain then sailed by junk from the island to Kaohsiung, and the Royal Navy gunboat HMS Bustard found and rescued the remainder of the survivors.

In the early 1870s, William Campbell saw the island from aboard the Daphne, and wrote:

On 11 December 1937 the Dollar Steamship Company luxury ocean liner  ran aground in a typhoon on a reef at Zhongliao Bay. All 503 passengers and 330 crew survived and were safely brought ashore. Dollar Lines sold President Hoovers wreck to a Japanese salvage company, which spent the next three years breaking her up in situ.

In response to the wreck, members of the US public gave money through the American Red Cross for a lighthouse to be built near Zhongliao village.

A shipwreck of Dutch origin dating to the 19th century was found in June 2013.

Prisons
Green Island first served as an isolated spot and place of exile for political prisoners during the martial law period during the Kuomintang government, and especially in the White Terror. After their release, many of the prisoners jailed between the late 1940s and the late 1980s went on to establish the Democratic Progressive Party, most notably Shih Ming-teh. Writer and political dissident Bo Yang served his prison terms there.

The place where most of the political prisoners (such as Shih Ming-teh) were held was "Green Island Lodge" (Lǜ Dǎo Shānzhuāng). "Oasis Village" was the main penal colony. The prison was later closed, and its interior is now open to the public. "Green Island Prison" (Lǜdǎo Jiānyù) is also on the island and has housed prisoners considered to be among Taiwan's most dangerous criminals and gangsters. However, this has changed in recent years.

Geography
The island is formed of volcanic tholeiite, andesite, and volcanic explosive fragments with an area of 15 km2. The volcano erupted from the Pliocene to Pleistocene epochs and is part of the Luzon Volcanic Arc. The andesite rock contains some visible crystals of pyroxene or amphibole. The geochemistry of the rock shows it is enriched in potassium, strontium and rubidium and light rare earth elements. Chromium and nickel are depleted.

Fauna
The island is a habitat for Formosan sika deer, Reeves's muntjacs, Ryukyu flying foxes, and resident and migratory birds.

Local population
In 1995 fewer than half of the registered 2,634 residents of the island actually lived on the island. The population is dwindling due to the difficulty of finding jobs on the island. The island has two pre-schools, one kindergarten, two elementary schools and one middle school. To pursue any education at the senior high school level or above, islanders must move to the main island of Taiwan. Public service centres include one seniors' home, one library, and one community centre.

The villages and the settlements (聚落) they administer are:
 Zhongliao Village (中寮村)
 Zhongliao
 Nanliao Village (南寮村)
 Nanliao (南寮)
 Yugang (漁港)
 Gongguan Village (公館村)
 Gongguan (公館)
 Chaikou (柴口)
 Liumagou (流麻溝)
 Dahu (大湖)
 Zuoping (左坪)

The following abandoned aboriginal tribal settlements also belong to Gongguan Village:
 Youzihu (柚子湖)
 Nanzihu (楠子湖)
 Haishenping (海參坪)
 Dabaisha (大白沙)

Power generation
The island is powered by its only diesel-fired power plant with a capacity of 29.1 MW, consisting of 28 units of generation.

Tourist attractions
 Green Island Human Rights Culture Park
 Lüdao Lighthouse
 Green Island Dive Sites Recreational diving is popular for visitors. There are many dive sites that are established with walkways down to ocean About 150 meter Off Shilang, lies the biggest reef attraction 'Big Mushroom Coral' its height about 12m, width around 31m.
 Sika Deer Ecological Park
 Sleeping Beauty Rock
 Zhaori Hot Spring Sea water heated from the volcanic action rises to the surface next to coral reefs at 53℃ and pH7.5.

Transportation

Lüdao Airport provides flights to Taitung Airport in Taitung City. There are also ferries travelling from Nanliao Harbor to Fugang Fishery Harbor in Taitung City.

Books
Green island is a subject in the following book:
Green Island, a novel (Knopf 2016) by Shawna Yang Ryan.

See also
 List of islands of Taiwan
 List of islands in the East China Sea

References

Citations

Bibliography

 .

External links

 Tourism  (Chinese)
 Book Trips to Green Island here! (English)

Islands of Taiwan
Townships in Taitung County
Landforms of Taitung County